The 1950 Baylor Bears football team represented Baylor University in the 1950 college football season. The Bears placed second in the Southwest Conference with an overall record of 7–3. Two players - Larry Isbell (Back) and Harold Riley (End) - were selected as All-Southwest Conference players. The 1950 season was the inaugural season for Baylor University's new state of the art 50,000 seat Baylor Stadium.

Schedule

References

Baylor
Baylor Bears football seasons
Baylor Bears football